Sretenka (also: Ak-Kyrcho) is a village in the Moskva District of Chüy Region of Kyrgyzstan. Its population was 4,226 in 2021.

References

Populated places in Chüy Region